Olive Rose Sutherland (1894–1984) was a notable New Zealand teacher. She was born in Masterton, Wairarapa, New Zealand in 1894.

Her younger brother, Dr Ivan Sutherland, ethnologist and academic, died in 1952.

References

1894 births
1984 deaths
New Zealand schoolteachers
People from Masterton